sysstat (system statistics) is a collection of performance monitoring tools for Linux. It is available on Unix and Unix-like operating systems.

Software included in sysstat package: 
 sar [6], Collect, report, or save system activity information.
 iostat (1) reports basic CPU statistics and input/output statistics for devices, partitions and network filesystems.
 mpstat(1) reports individual or combined processor related statistics.
 pidstat(1) reports statistics for Linux tasks (processes) : I/O, CPU, memory, etc.
 nfsiostat(1) reports input/output statistics for network filesystems (NFS).
 cifsiostat(1) reports I/O statistics for CIFS resources.

References

2. "http://sebastien.godard.pagesperso-orange.fr/". | SYSSTAT Utilities Homepage. Retrieved 21 September 2020

See also
 sar (Unix)

Utility software